Clarksville Historic District may refer to:

Clarksville Historic District (Clarksville, Missouri), listed on the NRHP in Missouri
Clarksville Historic District (Austin, Texas), listed on the NRHP in Texas
Clarksville Historic District (Clarksville, Virginia), listed on the NRHP in Virginia

See also
Clarksville (disambiguation)
Clarksville Architectural District, Clarksville, Tennessee, a historic district listed on the NRHP in Montgomery County, Tennessee
Clarksville Industrial District, Clarksville, Tennessee, a historic district listed on the NRHP in Montgomery County, Tennessee